Jonas Gelžinis (born 2 March 1988) is a Lithuanian racing driver. J.Gelžinis won Porsche Carrera Cup Great Britain Pro-Am1 class champion title in 2011. From 2012 he raced in Pro class and finished runner up in 2013. He is also a record ten-time winner of the Palanga 1000km Challenge. He was selected for FIA 2012 Young Driver Excellence Academy. Only 18 young talented drivers were selected from around the world. Moreover, Jonas was also selected for 2013 PORSCHE INTERNATIONAL CUP SCHOLARSHIP shootout. Together with Earl Bamber, Johan Kristoffersson and other top drivers from Porsche Carrera Cups. His younger brother Ignas Gelžinis is also racing driver.

Career summary

Early years

In the beginning of his career, Jonas Gelžinis became a Lithuanian kart champion in "Raket" class. From 2001 to 2003 he was a leading driver in "ICA Junior" class.

In 2005 Jonas Gelžinis went to rallying. In rally "Aplink Lietuvą" (eng. "Around Lithuania") he finished fourth in "A/R 2000" class. In 2006 rally "Kauno ruduo", he finished second in his "A/R 2000" class. In 2005 Jonas Gelžinis also participated in 1000 kilometrų lenktynės for the first time and finished third overall and took a victory in his class. He won the race in 2006. Jonas Gelžinis later repeated this achievement in 2008, 2009, 2014 and 2015.

From 2005 to 2006 Jonas Gelžinis was competing in Volkswagen Castrol Cup. In his rookie year he took one third-place finish, set fastest lap time twice and ended the season in 8th place overall. In the following year he finished as runner-up.

2007-2009: Porsche Carrera Cup Scandinavia
In 2007 Jonas Gelžinis made his debut in "Porsche Carrera Cup Scandinavia" together with Juta Racing. In his debut season he scored 12 points and took 13th place in final standings. In the following year Jonas Gelžinis enjoyed greater success, scored 131 points and took 7th place in final standings. 2009 season was even more successful. Jonas Gelžinis scored 269 points, including one second-place finish, and took 5th place in final standings.

2010-2013: Porsche Carrera Cup Great Britain
After successful 2009 Porsche Carrera Cup season in Scandinavia, in 2010 Jonas Gelžinis moved to Porsche Carrera Cup Great Britain, participating in "Pro-AM1" class. He demonstrated stable results thorough the season and scored 143 points. This was enough to take 10th place in overall standings and 3rd in "Pro-AM1" class.

In 2011 Jonas Gelžinis continued to drive for the Juta Racing team. Jonas Gelžinis continued to impress and took 6th place in overall standings, scoring 167 points and became the winner of "Pro-AM1" class. Jonas also scored pole position in Donington, second round of the season, but during the race he was unable to defend this position from rivals who were driving more powerful cars. Fourth place finish was his best result of the season.

After victory in "Pro-AM1" class, in 2012 Jonas Gelžinis stepped up into "Pro" class. He enjoyed immediate success, taking four podium finishes in Brands Hatch and Donington. After setback in Thruxton, Jonas Gelžinis took four more podiums in Oulton Park and Croft Circuit. Second half of the season was less successful, as he was disqualified from the first race in Snetterton and took only two podium finishes in Rockingham and Silverstone. He ended the season with high note, taking his and the team's first race victory in Porsche Carrera Cup Great Britain in the final round of the season, held in Brands Hatch. Jonas Gelžinis took 4th place in final standings with 259 points.

Jonas Gelžinis continued to demonstrate strong form in 2013, finishing on podium in the first six races of the season and taking the championship lead. This was the first time in Porsche Carrera Cup Great Britain history when racing driver from outside United Kingdom had taken the lead in the standings. After unsuccessful weekend in Oulton Park Jonas Gelžinis lost championship lead to Michael Meadows, but then took three victories in a row in Croft Circuit and Snetterton. Jonas Gelžinis took four more podium finishes in the second half of the season and kept his championship hopes until the final round. However, he was unable to regain championship lead and ended the season in second place with 310 points - 15 points less than champion Michael Meadows.

Jonas Gelžinis was selected for FIA 2012 Young Driver Excellence Academy. Only 18 young- talented drivers were selected from around the world

Jonas Gelžinis was also selected for 2013 PORSCHE INTERNATIONAL CUP SCHOLARSHIP shootout. Together with Earl Bamber, Johan Kristoffersson and other top drivers from Porsche Carrera Cups.

References

External links
 
 

1988 births
Living people
Lithuanian racing drivers
Porsche Carrera Cup GB drivers
FIA Motorsport Games drivers
24H Series drivers